Perarasu is a 2006 Indian Tamil-language action crime film directed by Udhayan. The film starring Vijayakanth, Debina Bonnerjee, Prakash Raj, Sarath Babu, Anandaraj and Pandiarajan. The music is composed by Pravin Mani. The film follows the pattern of southern masala movie with good-cop-versus-bad-guy story. This film became an average grosser.

Perarasu is similar to several earlier films of Vijayakanth, like Vallarasu (2000) and Pulan Visaranai (1990). He plays a dual role of identical twins as a law enforcer and a vigilante.

Plot
It is basically an investigative film as CBI officer Kasi Viswanathan (Vijayakanth) is entrusted to investigate the mysterious disappearance of Judge Sadhasivam (Nassar). The Kasi Viswanathan team comprises junior officer DCP Kesavan Nair IPS (Anandaraj) and a head constable Kandhasamy (Pandiarajan).

Soon Kasi finds out that a state minister Ilakkiyan (Prakash Raj) is behind all crimes in the city, and he is assisted by three senior cops. Suddenly, one by one, the bad cops are killed, with needle of suspicion resting on Kasi, as a lookalike is behind the murders. It is revealed that it is a revenge killing by Perarasu Pandiyan (Vijayakanth), Kasi's twin brother, and that Kasi's birth name is Ilavarasu Pandiyan.

We are told in a flashback by the family retainer Maarimuthu (Chandrasekhar) that Kasi was the long-lost twin brother of Perarasu Ilavarasu Pandiyan, and their father, the local chieftain Chakkaravarthi Pandiyan (Sarath Babu), was at one time the kingmaker of Panchalankurichi. After making Sivapprakasam (Mansoor Ali Khan) and Ilakkiyan MLAs, he falls out with them and they murder him. Perarasu, who has seen this murder, now wants to take revenge.

In the end, Perarasu fits a bomb on a chair in a meeting on which Ilakkiyan sits. Kasi, desperate to save Ilakkiyan, goes into the room and prefers to die with Ilakkiyan. Perarasu feeling proud for his brother preferring to give up his life for his duty, saves both of them, but is shot by Ilakkiyan. Kasi then shoots Ilakkiyan, and Perarasu takes the blame before dying. The film ends with Kasi marrying the heroine and returning to become the next chieftain of his native village.

Cast

 Vijayakanth as Perarasu Pandiyan (Perarasu) and Ilavarasu Pandiyan (Kasi Viswanathan IPS) CBI Officer
 Debina Bonnerjee as Aishwarya
 Prakash Raj as Ilakkiyan
 Sarath Babu as Chakkaravarthi Pandiyan
 Anandaraj as DCP Kesavan Nair IPS
 Pandiarajan as Kandhasamy
 Nassar as Sadhasivam
 Mansoor Ali Khan as Sivaprakasam
 Chandrasekhar as Marimuthu
 Riyaz Khan as Kabali
 Ajay Rathnam as Inspector Azhagappan
 O. A. K. Sundar  as Inspector Shenbagamoorthy
 Sampath Raj as ACP Chidambaranathan
 Chitti Babu as Ilakkiyan's assistant
 LIC Narasimhan as Shop manager
 Ponnambalam as Bullet Mani
 Mahanadi Shankar as Otteri Shankar
 Ragasya as Jasmine
 S. N. Lakshmi as Aishwarya's grandmother
 T. P. Gajendran as Sathyanathan
 Anjali Devi as Sadhasivam's wife
 Srividya as Sadhasivam's daughter
 Sundari as Chidambaranathan's wife
 Bava Lakshmanan as Constable Ravindran
 Muthukaalai as Ayyam Perumal
 Vijay Ganesh as Man at the bus station
 Kovai Senthil as Party member
 Velmurugan as Party member
 Selvakumar as Party member
 Boys Rajan as Bomb disposal technician
 Kandasamy as Elephant owner
 Nitish Veera as Man helping Sudesi
 Sregajesh as Sub-inspector
 Shankar as Aishwarya's friend
 Venba as Aishwarya's friend
 Kabir as Aishwarya's friend
 Chandrahassan Jayaprakash as Young Perarasu Pandiyan

Soundtrack
The music was composed by Pravin Mani.

References

External links
Perarasu Soundtrack at Softtamil.Net
Perarasu Gallery at Softtamil.Net
Perarasu Trailer at Softtamil.Net
 

2006 films
Twins in Indian films
2000s Tamil-language films